Hans Christian Knudsen (March 4, 1763 – March 4, 1816) was a Danish stage actor and opera singer.  He was an elite actor of the Royal Danish Theatre in 1786–1816, known for his roles in theater comedy and opera performances. During the Battle of Copenhagen (1801) as well as the Battle of Copenhagen (1807), he was noted for having strengthened morale among the public as a patriotic singer and helping collect funds for the victims.

References 

1763 births
1816 deaths
18th-century Danish male actors
19th-century Danish male actors
18th-century Danish male opera singers
19th-century Danish male opera singers